William David Coolidge (October 23, 1873 – February 3, 1975) was an American physicist and engineer, who made major contributions to X-ray machines. He was the director of the General Electric Research Laboratory and a vice-president of the corporation. He was also famous for the development of "ductile tungsten", which is important for the incandescent light bulb.

Early years
Coolidge was born on a farm near Hudson, Massachusetts. He studied electrical engineering from 1891 until 1896 at the Massachusetts Institute of Technology (MIT). After a year as a laboratory assistant, he went to Germany for further study and received his doctorate from the University of Leipzig. From 1899 to 1905 he was a research assistant to Arthur A. Noyes of the Chemistry Department at MIT.

Ductile tungsten
Coolidge went to work as a researcher at General Electric's new research laboratory in 1905, where he conducted experiments that led to the use of tungsten as filaments in light bulbs. He developed 'ductile tungsten', which could be more easily drawn into filaments, by purifying tungsten oxide. Starting in 1911, General Electric marketed lamps using the new metal and they soon became an important source of income for GE. He applied for and received a patent (US#1,082,933) for this 'invention' in 1913. However, in 1928 a US court ruled that his 1913 patent was not valid as an invention.

Improved X-ray tube
In 1913 he invented the Coolidge tube, an X-ray tube with an improved cathode for use in X-ray machines that allowed for more intense visualization of deep-seated anatomy and tumors.  The Coolidge tube, which also utilized a tungsten filament, was a major development in the then-nascent medical specialty of radiology (US patent filed in 1913 and granted as US Patent 1,203,495 in 1916).  Its basic design is still in use. He also invented the first rotating anode X-ray tube.

Awards
The American Academy of Arts and Sciences awarded Coolidge the Rumford Prize in 1914. Coolidge was awarded the American Institute of Electrical Engineers Edison Medal in 1927 For his contributions to the incandescent electric lighting and the X-rays art. He rejected this prestigious award in 1926 on the basis that his ductile tungsten patent (1913) was ruled by court as invalid.  He was awarded the Howard N. Potts Medal in 1926 and the Louis E. Levy Medal in 1927.  Coolidge was awarded the Faraday Medal in 1939.  He was awarded the Franklin Medal in 1944. The city of Remscheid awarded him with the Röntgen Medal for his invention of the hot cathode X-ray tube in 1963. In 1975 he was elected to the National Inventors Hall of Fame, shortly before his death at age 101 in Schenectady, New York.

Later career
Coolidge became director of the GE research laboratory in 1932, and a vice-president of General Electric in 1940, until his retirement in 1944. He continued to consult for GE after retirement.

Patents

 Coolidge, "Tungsten and method of making the same for use as filaments of incandescent electric lamps and for other purposes."
 Coolidge, Coolidge tube
 Coolidge, "X-ray tube"
 Coolidge, "X-ray apparatus"
 Coolidge, "Stereoscopic x-ray apparatus"
 Coolidge, "X-ray apparatus"
 Coolidge, "X-ray apparatus"
 Coolidge, "X-ray apparatus"
 Coolidge, "X-ray apparatus"
 Coolidge, "X-ray apparatus"
 Coolidge, "X-ray tube shield'''
 Coolidge, "X-ray device"
 Coolidge, "X-ray apparatus"
 Coolidge, "X-ray apparatus"
 Coolidge, "X-ray apparatus"
 Coolidge, "X-ray apparatus and method"
 Coolidge, "X-ray apparatus"
 Coolidge, "X-ray apparatus"
 Coolidge, "X-ray apparatus"
 Coolidge, "X-ray device"
 Coolidge, "X-ray anode"
 Coolidge, "X-ray tube"
 Coolidge, "X-ray tube"
 Coolidge, "X-ray device"
 Coolidge, "X-ray device"

Notes

References
*

External links
The Cathode Ray Tube site
William Coolidge's Case File at The Franklin Institute with info about his 1926 Franklin Award for the x-ray tube
IEEE History Center biography
National Academy of Sciences Biographical Memoir
Andrea Sella's Classic Kit: Coolidge's X-ray Tube
John Anderson Miller, Yankee scientist: William David Coolidge'', Mohawk Development Service, 1963 

American physicists
Members of the United States National Academy of Sciences
IEEE Edison Medal recipients
MIT School of Engineering alumni
20th-century American inventors
American centenarians
Men centenarians
People from Hudson, Massachusetts
1873 births
1975 deaths
Howard N. Potts Medal recipients